Fiji competed at the 1964 Summer Paralympics in Tokyo, Japan. It was Fiji's first participation in the Paralympic Games. The country (a British colony at the time) was represented by a single athlete, who competed in weightlifting, and did not win a medal.

Weightlifting

References

Nations at the 1964 Summer Paralympics
1964
Paralympics